"Never Should've Let You Go" is a song performed by American contemporary R&B group Hi-Five. It initially appeared on the soundtrack to the film Sister Act 2: Back in the Habit and was later included as the opening track on the group's third studio album Faithful. The song peaked at #30 on the Billboard Hot 100 in 1993.

Music video

The official music video for "Never Should've Let You Go" was directed by Marcus Nispel.

Chart positions

References

External links
 
 

1993 songs
1993 singles
Hi-Five songs
Jive Records singles
Music videos directed by Marcus Nispel
Song recordings produced by Joe (singer)
Songs written by Eric Foster White